The North Island giant moa (Dinornis novaezealandiae) is an extinct moa in the genus Dinornis. Even though it might have walked with a lowered posture, standing upright, it would have been the tallest bird ever to exist, with a height estimated up to 3.6 metres (12 feet).

Taxonomy
 
 
It was a ratite and a member of the order Dinornithiformes.  The Dinornithiformes were flightless birds with a sternum but without a keel.  They also had a distinctive palate.

Origin
The origin of ratites is becoming clearer, as it is now believed that early ancestors of these birds were able to fly (Davies, 2003). From such fossil evidence it is believed that the early flying ratites originated in the Northern Hemisphere and flew to the Southern Hemisphere (Davies, 2003). This movement of flying ancestors is believed to be the cause of the distribution of ratites across the Southern Hemisphere (Davies, 2003).

Appearance
The Dinornis novaezealandiae has been described as a bird that was “two-legged, tailless, wingless [and] clad in woolly fibres” (Armstrong 2010, p. 327). It had, “long, shaggy hair-like feathers up to 18 cm long” (Szabo, 2013). Feather and skin fragments indicate that all but the legs were fully feathered and that the wings of this bird were not visible. Their feathers were brown, sometimes with pale edging.

Anatomy

Research shows that the D. novaezealandiae displayed a large reversed sexual dimorphism whereby the females were much larger than males, estimated to have had up to twice the body mass of males (Turvey & Holdaway 2005, p. 70). Dinornis had long slim, elongated bones compared to other moa species (Turvey & Holdaway 2005, p. 75). Using algorithms derived from the bone findings of juvenile Dinornis, an adult male has been estimated to weigh between 55 and 88 kg whilst females between 78 and 249 kg (Turvey & Holdaway 2005, p. 76). The growth and development of Dinornis long bones, compared to that of other ratites such as the Ostrich, has been found to be much slower (Turvey & Holdaway 2005, p. 76). The North Island brown kiwi, that does not reach adult body mass until 12 months, is viewed as a more appropriate developmental analog for the Dinornis due to the similarities that have been drawn between the time taken to reach complete maturity of hindlimbs (5 years), as well as the time upon which tarsals commence fusion with adjacent long bones (4 years) (Turvey & Holdaway 2005, p. 79). Due to extensive land clearance for agriculture during the nineteenth and twentieth century, most land surface containing moa bones was lost throughout New Zealand, making the bones of the D. novaezealandiae a rarity that are only found in remote, undisturbed and rarely visited sites (Wood & Wilmshurst 2013, p. 254).

Habitat
This moa lived on the North Island of New Zealand, and lived in the lowlands (shrublands, grasslands, dunelands, and forests). The Dinornis was a widely represented genus of moa in the North Island of New Zealand (Scarlett 1974, p. 1). The habitat of the Dinornis novaezealandiae is thought to have remained relatively unchanged for hundreds of thousands of years (McCallum et al. 2013, p.e50732). This was in part due to the bird's inability to fly, as this restricted its movement between islands and therefore confined the species to the North Island of New Zealand (Lomolino et al. 2021, p. 5). Shifts in this moa's habitat have been noted during particular times of changing climates and vegetative zones (Lomolino et al. 2021, p. 1)  and in reaction to the influence of anthropogenic factors such as the introduction of Polynesian rat (Rattus exulans) and Polynesian dog (Canis familiaris) (Lomolino et al. 2021, p. 1). Later, the human environmental impact of fires made by the Māori people also contributed to habitat alterations (Lomolino et al. 2021, p. 10). Based on recent knowledge, the Kahikatea-Pukatea-tawa forest, Waikato, was home to the majority of Dinornis novaezealandiae (Lomolino et al. 2021, p. 5). However, bone discoveries also reveal it to have been in nearby places, such as Opito, Auckland, where it was the predominant genus of moa (Scarlett 1974, p. 11).

Diet
Dinornis novaezealandie was one of the largest herbivores in New Zealand's terrestrial ecosystem (Wood et al. 2020, p. 15). Their diet is described as diverse, consuming a wide range of plant taxa (Wood et al. 2020, p. 14). It is difficult to be certain of the exact diet that this species of moa would have eaten, as coprolites and gizzard content for this species of moa have not yet been found (Wood et al. 2020, p. 17). However, studies propose that the diet would have been similar to that of the Dinornis robustus (South Island giant moa) due to the similarities in morphology and the landscapes that they roamed (Wood et al. 2020, p. 17). This would suggest that like the Dinornis robustus, the Dinornis novaezealandie diet would consist of forest trees, especially Southern Beech (Nothofagaceae), seeds and leaves of small shrubs in forest areas (Wood et al. 2020, p. 9). In non-forest areas there is speculation that they may have grazed on herbs (Wood et al. 2020, p. 9). There is also theories that with such a diverse range of plants restricted to the North Island, if coprolites and gizzard content for the Dinornis novaezealandiae are found, this would likely expand the number of plant taxa known to have been eaten by moa (Wood et al. 2020, P.17). Research into moa beak shapes and jaw muscle size provide some evidence for the diverse diets of moa (Baker et al. 2005, p. 8261). From such research it has been found that large Dinornis browsed primarily on coarse twigs (Baker et al. 2005, p. 8261). Further speculation suggests that in order to ferment their plant diet in accordance with their large body size, moa such as D. novaezealandiae may have evolved to have long intestines (Baker et al. 2005, p. 8261).

Behaviour and ecology
New Zealand plants and moa were in co-evolution (Wood et al. 2020, p. 2). Moa have been found to filiramulate growth habit in plants such as divarication, heteroblasty, deciduousness, spines or spine like structures (enlarged stinging hairs), leaf loss and photosynthetic stems, mimicry and reduced visual apparency, tough and fibrous leaves, distasteful compounds and low nutrient status (Wood et al. 2020, p. 2). Though moa ate flowers, it is unlikely that they contributed to pollination processes (Wood et al. 2020, p. 15). On the contrary, this would have been a more destructive process than other impacts the Dinornis novaezealandiae may have had on the North Island's ecology (Wood et al. 2020, p. 15). The deep, longstanding interconnectedness between plants and moa means that the consequences of the extinction of the Dinornis novaezealandiae may still be largely unknown (Wood et al. 2020, p. 2).

Spore disposal
There are theories that due to the moa's longstanding prevalence in New Zealand's landscape, they would have come to form certain roles in New Zealand's ecology. One example that has been proposed is the possibility of their ability to spread seeds (Wood et al. 2020, p. 15). This stems from findings in moa specimen examinations that show different species of fungi that moa ingested, such as Cortinarius, because this fungus is known in particular to be associated with higher spore dispersal by birds (Wood et al. 2020, p. 15).

Moa dung
There is also theories that moa defecation and their herbivorous diet may have contributed to nutrient spreading and cycling, though this is not easy to validate (Wood et al.2020, p. 16). However, large dung from the Dinornis novaezealandie would have likely nurtured the existence of dung beetles and dung mosses (Splachnaceae) in the North Island (Wood et al. 2020, p. 16). Some of the dung mosses may have included those of the Tayloria genus (Wood et al. 2020, p. 16).

Moa tracks
The enormous, flightless birds caused large paths to be cleared through the landscape. It was observed in the Poukawa region that these would often lead to freshwater springs and the bottom of rocky cliffs; where they would tend to nest and roost (Horn 1989, p. 46). Once this observation was made these paths became particularly useful for humans when searching for fresh water sources and were continued to be used for these purposes long after the moa's extinction (Horn 1989, p. 47).

Reproduction

Whole moa eggs are a rare find in archaeology (Huynen et al. 2010, p. 16201), however the abundance of fragments suggest that when fresh, the egg of the Dinornis novaezealandiae is estimated to have weighed over 3 kg and 190 x 150mm (Szabo, 2013). Ancient DNA results reveal that surfaces of the outer shell of eggs that belonged to Dinornis novaezealandiae yielded DNA from males only (Huynen et al. 2010, p. 16203). This indicates that the males were the likely incubators of eggs (Huynen et al. 2010, p. 16203). Findings also show that the inside of these eggs, and the remains on the outer surface, matched female DNA, which is thought to be from the egg laying process (Huynen et al. 2010, p. 16203). The eggs of Dinornis have also been shown to be more susceptible to breakage than any of the 3,434 avian species measured to date (Huynen et al. 2010, p. 16204). Though the male D. novaezealandiae were lighter than females, questions have been raised as to how birds of such weight, even those that were smaller, could manage to incubate the fragile eggs successfully since the possibility of breakage is many times greater than that of any other bird (Huynen et al. 2010, p. 16204).  For this reason, it is unlikely that larger moa, such as the D. novaezealandiae, would have been able to incubate their eggs using the same contact method that is practiced by almost all birds (Huynen et al. 2010, p. 16204). Whilst the exact structure remains unclear, it is more likely they would have formed a special nest that would support their body weight in some way (Huynen et al. 2010, p. 16204).

Relationship with humans
Some cultural depictions of moa focus on how the moa was best cooked and enjoyed as a food, such as, He koromiko te wahie i taona ai te moa (“The moa was cooked with the wood of the koromiko”) (Wehi & Cox, 2018). Other depictions, however, focus on the development and fate of their extinction. This is because the moa was used as a metaphor for the Māori people to express fears of their own extinction that developed; as illness, disease and deforestation, by European settlers, posed severe threat to their survival (Wehi & Cox, 2018). This is seen in sayings such as Huna I te huna a te moa ("Hidden as the moa hid") and "Dead as the Moa" (Wehi & Cox, 2018), as well as depictions of moa whereby Māori describe it as “having a human face and living in a cave,” (Armstrong 2010, p. 329).

Whilst hunting Dinornis novaezealandie was largely for consumption, findings have also shown that Dinornis bones were used to make many one-piece fish-hooks (Scarlett 1974, p. 11).

Extinction
The disappearance and eventually extinction of the moa occurred around the 15th c, 200 years after human settlement in New Zealand (Perry et al. 2014, p. 131). Before the settlement of humans, Dinornis novaezealandiae had few natural predators, meaning there was little threat that the species would become extinct (Huynen et al. 2014, p. 4). However, after the arrival of the Māori people and their human activities of hunting and fires, humans soon became a threat to all species of moa, including Dinornis novaezealandiae, as it has been found that there did not appear to be a preferred moa size for hunting (Perry et al. 2014, p. 131). Though geographically restricted to the North Island, the diversity of habitat that the moa could survive in has dismantled theories that its extinction could have been a result of habitat loss (Perry 2014, p. 133). Meanwhile, radiocarbon data shows that the vast spread of the highly mobile Māori people across the country, highly correlates with the time upon which moa populations were plummeting (Perry et al. 2014, pp. 131–134). This was the case across all geographical areas, not just those that were being deforested, but also other areas where human activities, such as hunting, were carried out (Perry et al. 2014, pp. 131–134). Though human settlement and hunting activities played the most significant role, there are some factors that may have inhibited Dinornis novaezealandiae abilities to reproduce at the rate that they were being culled, such as the introduction of Polynesian dogs (Szabo, 2013). This is because it is believed that their extinction was at least in part due Polynesian dogs Canis familiaris eating moa chicks (Szabo, 2013).

Footnotes

References
 Allen, E. W., Erxleben, J., Hanhart, M., Hanhart, N., Keulemans, J. G., Mintern B., Rowley, G. D., Smith, J., & Walther, T.(1878). Ornithological miscellany. Retrieved from. https://commons.wikimedia.org/wiki/File:Ornithological_miscellany_(5982107548).jpg January 11, 2022.
 
 
 
 
 
 
 
 
 
 
 
 Scarlett, R. J. (1974). Moa and man in New Zealand. Notornis, 21(1), 1–12.
 Szabo, M.J. (2013). (updated 2017). North Island giant moa. In Miskelly, C.M. (ed.) New Zealand Birds Online. Retrieved from https://nzbirdsonline.org.nz/species/north-island-giant-moa
 
 Wehi, P., & Cox, M. (2018). Dead as the Moa. Waikato.ac.nz. Retrieved from https://www.waikato.ac.nz/news-opinion/media/2018/dead-as-the-moa

External links
 North Island Giant Moa. Dinornis Novaezealandiae. by Paul Martinson. Artwork produced for the book Extinct Birds of New Zealand, by Alan Tennyson, Te Papa Press, Wellington, 2006
 Holotypes of Dinornis Novaezealandiae in the collection of the Museum of New Zealand Te Papa Tongarewa
 Ornithological miscellany. by Allen, Edgar W.; Erxleben, J.; Hanhart, Michael; Hanhart, N; Keulemans, J. G.; Mintern Bros.; Rowley, George Dawson; Smith, J.; Walther, T., Public domain, via Wikimedia Commons.

North Island giant moa
Bird extinctions since 1500
Birds of the North Island
Dinornithidae
Extinct birds of New Zealand
Extinct flightless birds
Higher-level bird taxa restricted to New Zealand
Holocene extinctions
Late Quaternary prehistoric birds
Ratites
Species made extinct by human activities